The Enschede Marathon is an annual marathon race held in the city of Enschede, Netherlands. The race is the distance of a typical marathon (42 km, 195 metres).  It has been held annually since 1991, after being bi-annual for the previous 44 years. The race crosses the German border through the city of Gronau. There has been a women's competition since 1981.

Kenyan Eliud Kipchoge is the current course record holder with his winning time of 2:04:30 hours from 2021. Kenyan Maurine Chepkemoi holds the women's best mark for the course with her time of 2:21:10 hours from 2022.

Past winners
Key:

Men

Women

References 

List of winners
Malcolm Heyworth & Wim van Hemert (2011-04-18). Enschede Marathon. Association of Road Racing Statisticians. Retrieved on 2011-04-22.

External links
 Enschede Marathon 2009
 Enschede Marathon
 Marathon Info

Marathons in the Netherlands
Spring (season) events in the Netherlands
1947 establishments in the Netherlands
Recurring sporting events established in 1947
Sports competitions in Enschede